Scandinavian Nights (Live in Stockholm 1970) is a double live-album by the British hard rock band Deep Purple. It was recorded in the Stockholm Konserthuset on 12 November 1970. It was originally released in 1988.

Background
The title Scandinavian Nights was used for both audio and video. A concert recorded in Sweden in 1970, and a concert filmed in Denmark in 1972.
(Live in Stockholm 1970 (2LP/2CD) and  Live in Denmark 1972 (DVD) / Machine Head Live (VHS/Laserdisc).)

Scandinavian Nights (Live in Stockholm 1970) is a 2 hour concert, consisting of 7 tracks, 
recorded at the Konserthuset in Stockholm on 12 November 1970, by Sveriges Radio, (Swedish National Radio, SR).

Broadcast in 2 separate 1-hour shows.
 "Midnight Hour", 14 November 1970. "Into the Fire", "Child in Time", "Paint It Black" and "Mandrake Root". 
"Rock From The Underworld", 31 August 1982. "Speed King", "Into the Fire", "Wring That Neck" and "Black Night".

A 2 LP bootleg of the full show called Alive Tribute To Wally appeared in the mid 80's. (Based on the 2 radio broadcasts.)

The tapes were re-mixed by Tom Leader at Angel Recording Studios in London, and officially 1st released in October 1988, under the title of Scandinavian Nights in Europe. It remains the prime example of the early Mk II set. Songs from the then-current album Deep Purple in Rock together with long improvised instrumental sections. In the US, the double CD, released in 1992, was titled Live and Rare.

The original master tapes were later discovered and remixed for a 2nd re-release as Live in Stockholm (Konserthuset 12 Nov. 1970) by Purple Records in 2005, with improved sound quality. This release is the most complete version of the concert. MC Introduction and all the interludes between the different songs are complete and the tracks appear in the right order as played on the night.

A new 3rd edition of the album, titled Stockholm 1970, was released in 2014 by EDEL as part of "The Official Deep Purple (Overseas) Live Series" with additional material: two songs recorded for "Pop Deux" (Pop 2) at Musicorama, La Taverne, L'Olympia in Paris on 8 October 1970, a contemporary Jon Lord interview from 1971; and a bonus DVD with Deep Purple's performance, "Doing Their Thing", at Granada TV Studios in Manchester on 14 July 1970, previously released on VHS.

Track listings

Scandinavian Nights (Live in Stockholm 1970) (2 LP Vinyl / 2 CD Editions) (Connoisseur Collection) (1988 - 1st Re-Mix)

Live in Stockholm  (Konserthuset 12 Nov. 1970) (2 CD Edition) (Purple Records) (2005 - 2nd Re-Mix)

Stockholm 1970  (2 CD & 1 DVD / 3 LP Vinyl Editions) (Deep Purple (Overseas) Live Series) (2014 - 3rd  Re-Mix)

Personnel

Deep Purple
Ritchie Blackmore : Lead Guitar
Ian Gillan : Lead Vocals, Congas
Jon Lord : Organ, Piano
Roger Glover : Bass Guitar
Ian Paice : Drums

Charts

Re-release

References

1988 live albums
2005 live albums
Deep Purple live albums
Purple Records live albums